The  is a women's professional wrestling world championship owned by the New Japan Pro-Wrestling promotion. The title is exclusively defended on shows promoted by NJPW, not only in Japan but worldwide, with talent from NJPW's sister promotion World Wonder Ring Stardom featuring as its primary contenders. The inaugural champion was Kairi. The current champion is Mercedes Moné, who is in her first reign.

History 

Ever since New Japan Pro-Wrestling (NJPW) was founded in 1972, the company had never had a women's championship. On July 29, 2022, it was announced by Takaaki Kidani, owner of World Wonder Ring Stardom and former chairman of NJPW through parent company Bushiroad, that Stardom's roster would compete for NJPW's first-ever women's championship, the IWGP Women's Championship, at the co-promoted event Historic X-Over, set to take place on November 20. The title is managed by the IWGP Executive Committee.

On August 23 at the press conference for Historic X-Over, the dates and venues for the inaugural tournament were announced. The tournament featured seven wrestlers, with four Stardom wrestlers and three foreign wrestlers participating in the tournament with the finals taking place on November 20. On August 27, four representatives from certain stables of Stardom were decided to compete in the four available slots. The representatives were Giulia (Donna Del Mondo), Mayu Iwatani (Stars), Starlight Kid (Oedo Tai), and Utami Hayashishita (Queen's Quest). The representatives either picked themselves or appointed another unit member to furtherly compete for the title.

Inaugural tournament

Reigns 
Kairi was the inaugural champion. She is also the oldest champion at 34 while Mercedes Moné is the youngest at 31.

Mercedes Moné is the current champion in her first reign. She won the title by defeating Kairi at Battle in the Valley on February 18, 2023 in San Jose, California.

References

External links 
 Official IWGP Women's Title History at New Japan Pro Wrestling

New Japan Pro-Wrestling championships
World Wonder Ring Stardom championships
Women's professional wrestling championships